Harvard Medical School (HMS) is the graduate medical school of Harvard University and is located in the Longwood Medical Area in Boston, Massachusetts. Founded in 1782, HMS is one of the oldest medical schools in the United States and is consistently ranked first for research among medical schools by U.S. News & World Report. Unlike most other leading medical schools, HMS does not operate in conjunction with a single hospital but is directly affiliated with several teaching hospitals in the Boston area. Affiliated teaching hospitals and research institutes include Dana–Farber Cancer Institute, Massachusetts General Hospital, Brigham and Women's Hospital, Beth Israel Deaconess Medical Center, Boston Children's Hospital, McLean Hospital, Cambridge Health Alliance, The Baker Center for Children and Families, and Spaulding Rehabilitation Hospital.

History 
 

Harvard Medical School was founded on September 19, 1782, after President Joseph Willard presented a report with plans for a medical school to the President and Fellows of Harvard College. The founding faculty members of Harvard Medical School were John Warren, Aaron Dexter, and Benjamin Waterhouse, a graduate of the University of Edinburgh Medical School. It is the third-oldest medical school in the United States, founded after the Perelman School of Medicine at the University of Pennsylvania and Columbia University Vagelos College of Physicians and Surgeons.

Lectures were first held in the basement of Harvard Hall and then later in Holden Chapel. Students paid no tuition but purchased tickets to five or six daily lectures.  The first two students graduated in 1788.

In the following century, the medical school moved locations several times due to changing clinical relationships, a function of the fact that Harvard Medical School does not directly own or operate a teaching hospital. In 1810, the school moved to Boston at what is now downtown Washington Street. In 1816, the school was moved to Mason Street and was called the Massachusetts Medical College of Harvard University in recognition of a gift from the Great and General Court of Massachusetts. In 1847, the school was moved to Grove Street to be closer to Massachusetts General Hospital. In 1883, the school was relocated to Copley Square. Prior to this move, Charles William Eliot became Harvard's president in 1869 and found the medical school in the worst condition of any part of the university. He instituted drastic reforms that raised admissions standards, instituted a formal degree program, and defined HMS as a professional school within Harvard University that laid the groundwork for its transformation into one of the leading medical schools in the world.

In 1906, the medical school moved to its current location in the Longwood Medical and Academic Area. The Longwood campus's five original marble-faced buildings of the quadrangle still remain in use today.

Innovations 
Harvard Medical School postdoctoral trainees and faculty have been associated with a number of important medical and public health innovations:

Broadening admissions

Women 

In mid-1847, Professor Walter Channing's proposal that women be admitted to lectures and examinations was rejected by the President and Fellows of Harvard College. While Harriot Kezia Hunt was soon after given permission to attend medical lectures, this permission was withdrawn in 1850.

In 1866, two women with extensive medical education elsewhere applied but were denied admission. In 1867, a single faculty member's vote blocked the admission of Susan Dimock.
In 1872, Harvard declined a gift of $10,000 conditioned on medical school admitting women medical students on the same term as men.
A similar offer of $50,000, by a group of ten women including Marie Elizabeth Zakrzewska, was declined in 1882; a committee of five was appointed to study the matter.
After the medical school moved from North Grove Street to Boylston Street in 1883, professor Henry Ingersoll Bowditch's proposal that the North Grove Street premises be used for medical education for women was rejected.

In 1943, a dean's committee recommended the admission of women, the proportion of men and women being dependent solely on the qualifications of the applicants. 
In 1945, the first class of women was admitted; projected benefits included helping male students learn to view women as equals, increasing the number of physicians in lower-paid specialties typically shunned by men, and replacing the weakest third of all-male classes with better-qualified women. By 1972, about one-fifth of Harvard medical students were women.

African Americans 
In 1850, three black men, Martin Delany, Daniel Laing Jr., and Isaac H. Snowden, were admitted to the school but were later expelled under pressure from faculty and other students.

In 1968, in response to a petition signed by hundreds of medical students, the faculty established a commission on relations with the black community in Boston; at the time less than one percent of Harvard medical students were black. By 1973, the number of black students admitted had tripled, and by the next year, it had quadrupled. In 2011, HMS appointed its first African American full Professor of medicine, Valerie E. Stone. That year they also appointed their first African-American Professor of Radiology, Stone's former classmate Tina Young Poussaint.

In 2019 LaShyra Nolen was the first black woman to be elected class president of Harvard Medical School.

Medical education

Curriculum 
Harvard Medical School has gone through many curricular revisions for its MD program. In recent decades, HMS has maintained a three-phase curriculum with a classroom-based pre-clerkship phase, a principal clinical experience (PCE), and a post-PCE phase.

The pre-clerkship phase has two curricular tracks. The majority of students enter in the more traditional Pathways track that focuses on active learning and earlier entry into the clinic with courses that include students from the Harvard School of Dental Medicine. Pathways students gain early exposure to the clinic through a longitudinal clinical skills course that lasts the duration of the pre-clerkship phase. A small portion of each class enter in the HST track, which is jointly administered with MIT. The HST track is designed to train physician-scientists with emphasis on basic physiology and quantitative understanding of biological processes through courses that include PhD students from MIT.

Admissions 
Admission to Harvard Medical School's MD program is highly selective. There are 165 total spots for each incoming class, with 135 spots in the Pathways curriculum and 30 spots in the HST program. While both use a single application, each curricular track independently evaluates applicants.

For the MD Class of 2023, 6,815 candidates applied and 227 were admitted (3.3%). There was a matriculation rate of 73%. For the Master of Medical Sciences (MMSc) program in Global Health Delivery, the Fall 2020 admissions rate was (8.2%).

Graduate education

PhD degree programs 
There are nine PhD programs based in Harvard Medical School. Students in these programs are all enrolled in the Graduate School of Arts and Sciences (GSAS) and are part of the HILS (Harvard Integrated Life Sciences) inter-program federation.

Master's degree programs 
Harvard Medical School offers two types of master's degrees, Master of Medical Sciences (MMSc) degrees and Master of Science (MS) degrees.

Postgraduate certificate programs 
Harvard Medical School offers several Postgraduate Certificate programs. These graduate-level programs may run up to twelve months. Admitted participants are awarded a Certificate from Harvard Medical School upon successful completion, and are eligible for associate membership in the Harvard Alumni Association.

Affiliated teaching hospitals and research institutes 
Harvard Medical School does not directly own or operate any hospitals and instead relies on affiliated teaching hospitals for clinical education. Medical students primarily complete their clinical experiences at the following hospitals.

Notable alumni 
There are over 10,425 alumni.

See also 

 Harvard School of Dental Medicine
 Boston Medical Library
 Warren Anatomical Museum
 List of Harvard University people
 List of Ivy League medical schools
 Longwood Medical and Academic Area

References

External links 
 

 
1782 establishments in Massachusetts
Medical School
Ivy League medical schools